Chi Mui (c.1953 - April 27, 2006) was the first Asian-American mayor of San Gabriel, California. He graduated cum laude with a Bachelor's Degree in civil engineering from Polytechnic University of New York in 1980. The San Gabriel post office is named after him.

Career 
Mui was a field representative for Lucille Roybal-Allard.

Mui was the mayor of San Gabriel.

Personal life 
In 1980, Mui moved to Southern California.

On April 27, 2006, Mui died from cancer.

Legacy 
 Chi Mui Post Office located at 120 S. Del Mar Ave., San Gabriel, California.

References

Polytechnic Institute of New York University alumni
Mayors of places in California
2006 deaths
Year of birth missing (living people)